Oliver J. Olson & Company was a shipping company founded by Oliver John Olson in 1930 in San Francisco, California. Oliver John Olson started in the lumber trade.  Oliver John Olson entered into a lumber partnership with Andrew F. Mahony in San Francisco in 1908. Oliver John Olson was president of the Olson-Mahony Lumber Company.  Oliver John Olson was born in San Francisco on January 20, 1872.

History
Oliver J. Olson Company was a shipping and lumber company founded by Oliver John Olson in 1916 in San Francisco, California. Oliver John Olson won a United States contract in April 1917 to build barracks, fences and buildings for the World War I  effort. The Oliver J. Olson Company was very successful, already owning seven ships from his previous company. Olson also built a new ship the Florence Olson. Oliver J. Olson brothers and son worked on the ships.
Post World War I Olson added routes to Hawaii,  Mexico and the Panama Canal Zone.  Oliver J. Olson Company bought four ships to add to the fleet. 
The Great Depression was hard but Oliver J. Olson Company was in good shape and made it through, moving the ships to more passager service. With his family an important part of this firm he incorporated in 1930 as Oliver J. Olson & Company. In 1937 Oliver J. Olson & Company won USA contacts for the movement of good to supply the built-up of World War 2, he purchased the SS Point Bonita a 1918 steamer, calling her Oliver Olson. Oliver J. Olson turned over more of the operations over to his sons. Oliver Jr. was president of the Richmond-San Rafael Ferry and later the other subsidiary Olson Ocean Towing Company. Edward Whitney (Whit) Olson became president of the Oliver J. Olson & Company.  George Olson as Olson & Company vice president. Oliver J. Olson brothers William Olson and Walter Olson worked in the firm and rose.  More routes were added to Los Angeles and San Diego, with more contract trips to Hawaii's Pearl Harbor. Needing more ships to go to Pearl Harbor Olson purchased the Coquina and Corrales, two steamers in Matson Navigation reserve fleet for $75,000 per ship. He renamed the ships the SS Cynthia Olson and Barbara Olson, they work Army Transport Service contacts. Later the Army Transport Service Bareboat charter both ships. In 1975 Oliver J. Olson Company and all of its subsidiaries were sold to Crown Zellerbach Corporation of San Francisco.

Ships: George L. Olson, Whitney Olson, Virginia Olson, and Florence Olson, Oliver Olson, Cynthia Olson and Barbara Olson.

Olson-Mahony Lumber Company
Olson-Mahony Lumber Company a timber distribution company was founded by the partnerships of Oliver John Olson and Andrew F. Mahony in San Francisco in 1908. To store lumber, Olson-Mahony Lumber Company, leased a 12,000 square feet of land and seawall wharf at Stockton street and the Embarcadero, what is now Sue Bierman Park. Olson-Mahony Lumber Company then add a covered wharf for loading and unloading of ships. Olson & Mahony Company was very successful, going from one ship in 1908 to seven ships by 1913. Olson-Mahony Lumber Company when into a partnership E.K. Wood Lumber Company, distributing their Lumber. Charles F. Van Damme (1881–1934) became the company secretary, a Bay Area entrepreneur.  Charles F. Van Damme, Oliver John Olson and Andrew F. Mahony stated a subsidiary Richmond–San Rafael Ferry and Transportation Company.  The company started the San Pablo Bay ferry service in 1915 between Castro Point in Richmond, California in Contra Costa County and San Quentin in Marin County. The first ferry owned was named Charles Van Damme, for Van Damme put up the money for the ferry. In 1916 Olson bought out Mahony share of the Olson-Mahony Lumber Company, but both were still partners in the Richmond–San Rafael Ferry and Transportation Company. Their son's continued that partnership in Richmond–San Rafael Ferry. Mahony tried to start his own shipping company, but failed. He later became the San Francisco police commissioner till his death in 1933.

Van Damme State Park is named after Charles F. Van Damme. Van Damme had purchased want is now the park with funds Richmond–San Rafael Ferry and Transportation Company. Van Damme dies in 1934 and the land became part of the California State Parks.  Charles Van Damme's father, John Van Damme was born in Ostend, Belgium, early settlers southern of Mendocino, California.  Charles Van Damme was born in 1881 in Little River, California.

Olson Ocean Towing Company
Olson Ocean Towing Company was a subsidiary of Oliver J. Olson & Company. Olson Ocean Towing Company operated tugboat and barge transportation service. One of the Olson Ocean Towing Company tugs was named E. Whitney Olson Sr. built in 1965 by the  San Diego Marine Construction Company of San Diego, California.

World War II

Oliver J. Olson & Company fleet of ships, Oliver J. Olson Lines, that were used to help the World War II effort. During World War II Oliver J. Olson & Company operated Merchant navy ships for the United States Shipping Board. During World War II JOliver J. Olson & Company was active with charter shipping with the Maritime Commission and War Shipping Administration. Oliver J. Olson & Company operated Liberty ships and Victory ships for the merchant navy. The ship was run by its Oliver J. Olson & Company crew and the US Navy supplied United States Navy Armed Guards to man the deck guns and radio.

SS Cynthia Olson
On December 6, 1941 Japanese submarine I-26 sank the Cynthia Olson, with shells and torpedoes 1,000 miles northeast of Hawaii.  Cynthia Olson's radio operator sent an SOS, picked up by SS Lurline and land station. Oliver J. Olson & Company Merchant Marine Master Berthel Carlsen was captain. The crew made it into the lifeboats and the next day, the  found them and provided some food. After the sighting, the 33 Cynthia Olson crew members and two United States Army passengers were ever seen again. The sinking was the first of many merchant ships to be sunk as the United States joined into World War II.

SS E. A. Bryan

SS E. A. Bryan operated by Oliver J. Olson & Company exploded while loading munitions at Port Chicago, California on July 17, 1944. Of the 320 men killed, 31 were Oliver J. Olson & Company's merchant seamen and 13 were E. A. Bryan's US Navy Armed Guardsmen.

Execution of crew members, SS Jean Nicolet 

Most of the crew make it into the lifeboats safety. The I-8 forced the crew onto the deck of the submarine and then killed most of them. The I-8 crew shot at both the crew and the lifeboats. The submarine crew took the crew's valuable. Those not shot, about 30 crew members, were hit and stabbed on the deck. Seeing in a plane, the submarine crew tossed overboard the remaining crew and dived. A Catalina flying boat spotted the crew in the water and sent  Royal Navy armed trawler  rescued the men. After over 30 hours in the water the crew was rescued on 4 July 1944.

Ships

Ships:
Howard Olson, purchased in 1946 for $116,000.
SS Barbara Olson, was SS Corrales 
SS Cynthia Olson, was SS Coquina 
George L. Olson, was 	SS Ryder Hanify, ran aground Coos Bay, Oregon on the North shore. 
Whitney Olson
Virginia Olson
Florence Olson, owned from 1917 to 1923. sank in 1941 as SS Willapa off Mansfield, Oregon  
SS Oliver Olson, was Point Bonita
Westerner
Virginia Olson
Annie Larson
Liberty ships operated for World War II:
 Sebastian Cermeno  June 27, 1943 Torpedoed and sunk by U.511 in Indian Ocean.
 E. A. Bryan  July 17, 1944 cargo exploded while loading munitions at Port Chicago, California a total loss.
 Don Marquis  Sept. 9, 1944 lost after fire and beached after collision with SS Missionary Ridge off Papua New Guinea
 SS Samuel G. French  
 SS Samuel Huntington bombed and destroyed
 SS Jean Nicolet July 2, 1944 Torpedoed, shelled and sunk by Japanese submarine I-8 south of Maldive Islands, most of crew killed in war crime.
Victory ships operated:
 Catawba Victory  
 Hunter Victory  
 SS Drexel Victory  20th Jan.1947 Grounded off Columbia River, Oregon. Refloated but sank 5 miles from Cape   
 Texarkana Victory  
 Wake Forest Victory  
 Xavier Victory  
Other
SS Paraiso

See also

World War II United States Merchant Navy

References 

Defunct shipping companies of the United States
American companies established in 1930